Milburn is an unincorporated community in Carlisle County, Kentucky, United States. Its elevation is 482 feet (147 m), and it is located at  (36.7986679, -88.8997817). Nearby cities include Arlington,  by air to the west, and Bardwell,  by air to the northwest; Milburn is connected to them by Kentucky Route 80 and Kentucky Route 1377 respectively. A fire station is located in Milburn, and a Creole cottage in the community, the George W. Stone House, is listed on the National Register of Historic Places.

References

Unincorporated communities in Carlisle County, Kentucky
Unincorporated communities in Kentucky